TX, T-X, or Tx may refer to:

 Texas, abbreviated as TX

Companies

Consumer product companies
 Tianxiang TX, a Chinese brand of drones and UAVs by Tianxiang Aerospace Science and Technology Co.
 TX Watch Company, a former watch company by the Timex Group

Media and telecommunication companies
 TX Digital Illusions, a former American video game developer
 TX Group, a Swiss media company
 TV Tokyo, a Japanese commercial broadcaster
 TX Network, a Japanese television network which flagship station is TV Tokyo

Transportation companies
 Air Caraïbes (IATA airline designator TX)

Electronics and machines
 Canon TX, a 35mm single-lens reflex camera
 Palm TX, a personal digital assistant
 Sony Xperia TX, a smartphone

Media
 Fenix TX, a pop punk band from Houston, Texas, formerly known as Riverfenix
 Fenix TX, the band's first album after their name change
 T-X (Terminatrix), the antagonist in the movie Terminator 3: Rise of the Machines

Science and technology
 Total Experience, a term Total Experience (abbreviation TX)

Astronomy
 TX Camelopardalis, a star in the Camelopardalis constellation
 TX Piscium, a carbon star in the Pisces constellation

Linguistics
 Tx (digraph)

Medicine
 Caspase 4, an enzyme
 Therapy, Tx or Tx in medical shorthand
 Treatment group, in an experiment, such as basic research or clinical trials
 Traction (orthopedics)
 Transplant, in the context of organ transplantation
 In the TNM staging system for cancer: 
 Size or extent of tumor cannot be evaluated
 Wildcard for any T stage (for example, a chemotherapy regimen prescribed for any T, any N, M1 = TxNxM1)

Telecommunications
 Transmission (telecommunications), generally
 Tx, the transmit signal in the RS-232 serial communication protocol

Transportation

Aircraft and airlines
 Boeing T-7 Red Hawk, known as the T-X until 2019
 T-X program
 Sperwill TX, a British paramotor

Automobiles
 Exeed TX, a 2019–present Chinese mid-size SUV
 Fairthrope TX, a 1967 British sports coupe
 Howmet TX, a 1968 American sports prototype racing car
 LEVC TX, a 2017–present British electric taxi cab

Buses
 TX series, a line of coaches manufactured by Vanhool

Rail
 Tsukuba Express, a Japanese railway line abbreviated as TX